Close to the Noise Floor: Formative UK Electronica 1975-1984 is a compilation album featuring electronica bands from 1975-1984. It was released on Cherry Red Records in April 2016.

Track listing

References

2016 compilation albums
Cherry Red Records compilation albums
Electronic compilation albums
Cassette culture 1970s–1990s